Kampamba Chintu (born 28 December 1980, Kabwe) is a Zambian football defender, he is currently player-manager at Kabwe Warriors. He was a member of the Zambian national team between 1999 and 2012.

Career
Chintu spent the first five years of his career with Zambian club Kabwe Warriors, he left the club temporarily in 2001 to join Swedish side IFK Hässleholm on loan. In 2004, Chintu agreed to move to South Africa to sign for Lamontville Golden Arrows, he scored twice in 61 appearances for Golden Arrows before leaving to move to fellow South African club Free State Stars, but Chintu appeared in just 22 appearances for the club before departing. 2008 saw him join his third team in South Africa as he signed for AmaZulu, 31 appearances followed as well as 2 goals for Chintu before he was on the move again when he joined Bidvest Wits where he participated in 20 matches before being released in August 2012.

In 2013, Chintu returned to Zambia and signed for his former club Kabwe Warriors but remained with them for just six months before going back to South Africa to play for Roses United, however his spell with Roses lasted just three months as he left to go back to Kabwe as player-manager.

Honours
National team
Zambia
Africa Cup of Nations: 2012
CAF African Youth: 1999
FIFA World Youth Cup: 1999

Notes

References

External links
 
 ZAMBIAFOOTBALL.com

 

1980 births
Living people
Zambian footballers
Zambian expatriate footballers
Zambian expatriate sportspeople in South Africa
Association football defenders
Kabwe Warriors F.C. players
AmaZulu F.C. players
Lamontville Golden Arrows F.C. players
Free State Stars F.C. players
Roses United F.C. players
Zambia international footballers
2008 Africa Cup of Nations players
2010 Africa Cup of Nations players
2012 Africa Cup of Nations players
Bidvest Wits F.C. players
Africa Cup of Nations-winning players